Year 1429 (MCDXXIX) was a common year starting on Saturday (link will display the full calendar) of the Julian calendar.

Events 
 January–December 
 February 12 – Battle of Rouvray (or "of the Herrings"): English forces under Sir John Fastolf defend a supply convoy, which is carrying rations (food) to the army of William de la Pole, 4th Earl of Suffolk at Orléans, from attack by the Comte de Clermont and John Stewart.
 April 29 – Siege of Orléans: Joan of Arc enters Orléans with a relief expedition.
 May 7 – The Tourelles, the last English siege fortification at Orléans, falls. Joan of Arc becomes the hero of the battle by returning, wounded, to lead the final charge.
 May 8 – The English, weakened by disease and lack of supplies, depart Orléans.
 June 18 – Battle of Patay: French forces under Joan of Arc smash the English forces under Lord Talbot and Sir John Fastolf, forcing the withdrawal of the English from the Loire Valley.
 July 17 – Charles VII of France is crowned in Rheims.
 September – The Hafsid Saracens attempt to capture Malta, but are repelled by its defenders.
 September 8 – Joan of Arc leads an unsuccessful attack on Paris, and is wounded.
November 4 – Armagnac–Burgundian Civil War: Joan of Arc liberates Saint-Pierre-le-Moûtier.
 November 24 – Joan of Arc  besieges La Charité.

 Date unknown 
 Fire destroys Turku.
 A series of seven customs offices and barriers are installed along the Grand Canal of China, during the reign of the Ming Dynasty's Yongle Emperor.

Births 
 January 17 – Antonio del Pollaiuolo, Italian artist (d.c. 1498)
 date unknown – Peter, Constable of Portugal (d. 1466)
 probable – Mino da Fiesole, Florentine sculptor (d. 1484)

Deaths 
 February – Giovanni di Bicci de' Medici, founder of the Medici dynasty of Florence (b. c. 1360)
 June 22 – Ghiyath al-Kashi, Persian mathematician and astronomer (b. 1380)
 July 4 – Carlo I Tocco, ruler of Epirus (b. 1372)
 July 12 – Jean Gerson, chancellor of the University of Paris (b. 1363)
 September 28 – Cymburgis of Masovia, Duchess of Austria by marriage to Duke Ernest the Iron of Inner Austria (b. 1394)
 October – Alexios IV Megas Komnenos, Empire of Trebizond (b. 1382)
 date unknown – Emperor Yeshaq I of Ethiopia (b. 1414)

References